The ST Aerospace A-4SU Super Skyhawk is a major upgrade project of the Douglas A-4S Skyhawk attack aircraft undertaken by Singapore Aircraft Industries (SAI, now ST Aerospace) in the 1980s. It was used exclusively by the Republic of Singapore Air Force (RSAF), serving in the fighter-bomber role from 1989 until retirement from front line service in 2005. Since mid-1999, the A-4SU took on the additional role of being the designated advanced jet trainer (AJT) aircraft for the RSAF's AJT training program/detachment in Cazaux, France.

Design and development

A-4S and TA-4S
Starting in 1973, the RSAF began to acquire Douglas A-4 Skyhawks. The first batch of over 50 airframes (ex-US Navy A-4Bs) was ordered and was subsequently requisitioned from the Military Aircraft Storage and Disposition Center at Davis–Monthan AFB, Arizona which was released to the Lockheed Aircraft Service Company at Ontario, California, and its subsidiary Lockheed Aircraft Service Singapore at Seletar Airfield, Singapore for a major overhaul and refurbishment.

These aircraft would later emerge as the A-4S single-seater (44 airframes) and the TA-4S two-seat trainer (three airframes), all having more than 100 changes incorporated (these included a slightly longer nose to house a new avionics package, five stores hardpoints instead of the usual three, a saddle-style Automatic Direction Finder dorsal hump, cockpit armour plating, spoilers, a cranked refuelling probe, AIM-9 Sidewinder capability, a brake parachute housing below the jetpipe into the standard A-4B airframes. As with the Israeli A-4Hs which were armed with a pair of 30 mm DEFA cannons, these were similarly armed with the  ADEN cannons in place of the original 20 mm Colt Mk 12 cannons. A later order of four two-seat trainer airframes was placed in 1976, and these joined the RSAF in 1977.

The TA-4S trainers were not the standard TA-4 with a common cockpit for the student and instructor pilot, but were instead rebuilt by Lockheed with a  fuselage plug inserted into the front fuselage and a separate bulged cockpit (giving better all round visibility) for the instructor seated behind the student pilot. This arrangement was unique for the RSAF but was not the first by Lockheed (the Lockheed SR-71B and U-2CT/U-2RT/TR-1B/TU-2S trainers also used stepped cockpits). As such converted/rebuilt airframes, these TA-4S trainers were powered by the original Wright J65 turbojet engines as used in the B/C models instead of the Pratt & Whitney J52 used by the purpose-built TA-4E/Fs tandem-seaters from Douglas assembly line; this was the main reason why the RSAF decided to not procure the TA-4E/Fs (if indeed an order was placed) and then having to maintain two different engines to power essentially the same aircraft type (a scenario not unlike having a fleet within a fleet).

All of the single-seaters were later retired when the upgraded A-4SU began to enter service, the twin-seaters were upgraded instead and remained in service.

A-4S-1 and TA-4S-1
A second batch of 70 airframes was ordered (mix of ex-US Navy A-4Bs and A-4Cs) in 1980, these were shipped directly to Singapore for rebuilding with the A-4Cs being rebuilt as the A-4S-1s while the A-4Bs remained in storage for use as spares. Along with a small number of TA-4S-1s, these newer Skyhawks (characterised by its straight refuelling probe instead of the cranked refuelling probe found on the original A-4S/TA-4S) would join the RSAF as attrition replacements from 1982. However, these airframes retained the original  Colt Mk 12 cannons of the A-4Cs.

In 1983, a third order of 8 TA-4S saw 16 stored A-4Bs from the Aerospace Maintenance and Regeneration Center being converted and rebuilt as the TA-4S-1 trainers (eight airframes).

A-4SU and TA-4SU Super Skyhawk

In 1985, as a result of four A-4S being written off in separate accidents, coupled with the low serviceability of the original batch of A-4S, investigations conducted by RSAF revealed that although there was plenty of fuselage life left, the Wright J65 turbojet engines in use by the Skyhawks were too old and the associated spare parts were becoming both difficult and expensive to obtain. Consequently, the RSAF decided to upgrade the A-4S/TA-4S rather than to replace them.

With SAI contracted as the main contractor for the upgrading project and a non-afterburning General Electric F404-GE-100D turbofan engine selected as the new engine, the upgrading project would later be extended to cover the entire fleet of newer A-4S-1s as well as taking the opportunity to completely modernize the avionics package (newly installed equipment now included a Pave Penny laser seeker mounted in the nose, an Inertial navigation system (INS), a Tactical air navigation system (TACAN), fore & aft Radar warning receivers (RWR) and chaff/flare countermeasures) of the aircraft.

The modernized A-4SU and TA-4SU versions with its new F404 turbofan engine had 29% more thrust, which resulted in a 30% reduction in takeoff time as well as an increase in usable payload, range and maximum speed.

Operational history

By 1974, the RSAF received enough refurbished A-4S to form the No. 142 Gryphon Squadron and No. 143 Phoenix Sqn, which were based at Tengah Air Base and Changi Air Base, respectively. In RSAF service, the A-4S/TA-4S were given 3-digit serials starting with 6 (e.g. 600, 651).

From 1982 A-4S-1 and TA-4S-1 Skyhawks would join the RSAF as attrition replacements with the balance being allocated in 1984 to form a new unit - No. 145 Hornet Squadron which was also based at Tengah Air Base. These were given 3-digit serial starting with 9 (e.g. 900, 929).

In total, approximately 150 airframes (all A-4Bs and Cs) were acquired by Singapore.

The modernized A-4SU Super Skyhawks were received by 143 Squadron first, followed by 142 and 145 Squadron of the RSAF from 1989 onwards. The type was also operated by the RSAF Black Knights aerobatic display team for precision aerial manoeuvers from 1990 to 2000.

End of front-line service

After 31 years of operations, the RSAF officially withdrew its fleet of A-4SU Super Skyhawks from operational combat service in Singapore on 31 March 2005. The A-4SU's achievements included flying directly from Singapore to the Philippines, incorporating the RSAF's first air-to-air refuelling mission in 1986, as well as the aerobatic display of the 'red and white' Super Skyhawks flown by the RSAF Black Knights during Asian Aerospace 1990, 1994 and 2000, it was last used by the Black Knights during Singapore's National Day Parade held on 9 August 2000. A month before its retirement, the Skyhawk squadron (145 Squadron) won the top honours in a strike exercise against its more modern F-16 and F-5 counterparts and emerged as the Top combat squadron in the Singapore Armed Forces Best Unit Competition, an honour it has held since year 2000.

On 5 October 2005, one A-4SU Skyhawk was delivered to Singapore Polytechnic as a teaching aid. Subsequently, Ngee Ann Polytechnic, Temasek Polytechnic and Nanyang Technological University would each receive an A-4SU Skyhawk as well.

Two of the retired A-4SU Super Skyhawks were also donated to the French Air and Space Museum (Musée de l'Air) for static display. On 12 January 2006, a Certificate of Transfer and Acceptance signing ceremony took place between representatives of the RSAF and the French Aeronautics Museum at Cazaux Air Base in France. Since then, only 928 was put on display in the Rosette Hall of the museum while 941 was stored.

Secondary role

In 1998, the French government offered the use of facilities at Cazaux Air Base. A 25-year lease for basing rights of 18 A-4SU aircraft and approximately 250 RSAF personnel and their families was signed later that year. Back in Singapore, 143 Squadron was disbanded in 1997, and its aircraft were handed over to 150 Squadron, which had given up its SIAI-Marchetti SF.260 basic trainers. The new squadron then took up the role of advanced jet training, using its aircraft as a lead-in fighter trainer for RSAF pilots. This made it the prime candidate for moving to France, and the first of 18 aircraft were "packed" and sent to France by ship in mid-1999 as part of the RSAF's Advanced Jet Training Program. The 11 remaining training aircraft (4× A-4SU and 7× TA-4SU) were originally scheduled to retire in 2007 but remained in service until the delivery of their replacement, the Alenia Aermacchi M-346 Master, which was scheduled for 2012.

Variants
A-4SU Super Skyhawk
Upgraded from A-4S-1.
TA-4SU Super Skyhawk
Upgraded from TA-4S and TA-4S-1 trainer.

Operators

Republic of Singapore Air Force
142 Squadron: last operational RSAF squadron to operate the Super Skyhawks, disbanded on 1 April 2005 but was subsequently reformed in 2015 to operate the F-15SG.
143 Squadron: disbanded in 1997 after handing over its remaining aircraft to 150 Sqn, subsequently reformed in 2003 to operate the F-16C/Ds.
145 Squadron: converted to F-16D+ in 2004.
150 Squadron: converted to M-346 in 2012.
The RSAF Black Knights aerobatic team operated the A-4SU from 1990 to 2000, they switched to an all F-16C six-ship formation for their performance during the 2008 Singapore Airshow.

Aircraft on display

A-4S (600) BuNo 142850, static display at Singapore Discovery Centre.
A-4S (690) BuNo 144979, static display at SAFTI Military Institute.
A-4S (607) BuNo 145013, static display at RSAF Museum.
TA-4S (651) BuNo 145047 (forward fuselage section and cockpit), static display at RSAF Museum.
A-4SU (928) BuNo 147797, static display at the French Aerospace Museum in Paris, while another A-4SU (941) BuNo 145071, was stored.
A-4SU (929) BuNo 145073, gate guardian at RSAF Museum.
TA-4SU (900) BuNo 147742, static display at RSAF Museum.

Specifications (A-4SU)

See also

References
Notes

Bibliography

Frawley, Gerard. The International Directory of Military Aircraft. Fyshwick, Australian Capital Territory, Australia: Aerospace Publications Pty Ltd., 2002. .

External links

Official Factsheet of A-4SU Super Skyhawk
A-4 Republic of Singapore Air Force page on Skyhawk.org
Archived Skyhawks bow out on a high note
The Singapore Skyhawk Story
A4D (A-4) Skyhawk Foreign Sales on Global Security.org
Singapore Drops Eurofighter from Critical Contract
Video

A-004SU
1980s Singaporean attack aircraft
Single-engined jet aircraft
Low-wing aircraft
Republic of Singapore Air Force
A-4SU
Aircraft first flown in 1986